Joe Mihaljevic (born September 19, 1960 in St. Louis, Missouri) is a retired  soccer forward.  He runs a reputable year-round soccer school in Folsom, California

Youth
His father, Djuro George Mihaljevic, a native of Croatia, played professionally in Europe before immigrating to the U.S.  He eventually settled in St. Louis, Missouri where he became the first head coach of the North American Soccer League's St. Louis Stars.  In 1966, George established the first soccer school in the United States in St. Louis,Missouri "Mihaljevic Soccer School", and developed many talented players.  At age 8, Mihaljevic began attending his father's school and played for its competitive team, Missouri Mules.  The team won 2 international youth tournaments in the Netherlands & Canada.

College
After graduating from high school in 1978, Mihaljevic was sent to live with relatives in the former Yugoslavia to train & play soccer.  He reluctantly turned down a 4-year contract with 1st Division Teams, Red Star Belgrade and OFK Beograd due to the country's impending civil war.  Upon returning to the United States,he attended Meramec Community College and was a first team "All AMERICAN" after he graduated junior college Mihaljevic was offered a full NCAA, Division I scholarship to Hartwick College in Oneonta, New York in 1978. Coached by one of the top coaches in the United States Jim Lennox a United States Staff Coach where Joe said he received the best training of his life along with his father George.  In addition to playing collegiate soccer, Mihaljevic played on amateur clubs. In 1981, he was on the Anheuser-Busch Soccer Club when it won the U.S. Amateur Cup. Mihaljevic scored the winning goal 2-1 against Philadelphia Bayern.

Professional career
In 1982, the Pittsburgh Spirit of the Major Indoor Soccer League (MISL) drafted Mihaljevic as its 2nd-round draft pick and played on a line with Stan Terlecki of Poland the Co-MVP of the League with Steve Zungul.  In 1988, Mihaljevic joined the Fort Wayne Flames of the American Indoor Soccer Association (AISA) for the Challenge Cup Playoffs.
In 1986, the San Jose Earthquakes of the Western Soccer Alliance (WSA) signed Mihaljevic.  The next year, he was the Alliance's "Leading Goal Scorer" and became the "United States' Leading Goal Scorer" in 1987 with seven goals and two assists.  He moved east to the Miami Sharks for the 1988 American Soccer League (ASL) season, under the coaching of 1970's World Cup Captain, Carlos Alberto Torres, of Brazil where he established himself as a force on the team by scoring 5 goals in the last 25 minutes of his 2nd game, defeating the Washington Diplomats, 5-1, a record for "Most Goals Scored in a Game". He also had Dirceu Guimares as a midfielder on the Miami Sharks. Dirceu Guimares was voted 3rd "Most Valuable Player in the World at the 1978 World Cup for Brazil behind Mario Kempes of Argentina and Robbie Rensenbrink of Holland.

In 1990, he joined the San Jose Oaks Soccer Club and remained with the team through the 1992 season when the team took the U.S. Open Cup. Mihaljevic was voted 1992 U.S. Open Cup "Most Valuable Player" with a goal and 2 assists in the final game (3-1).

Coaching
After retiring from playing professionally Mihaljevic re-opened his father's soccer school in Folsom, California in September 2003, also named "Mihaljevic Soccer School".

Personal 
Mihaljevic has 4 children with Lynette Trinidad-Mihaljevic (married 1994. divorced 2018): Joey, Dominique, John Paul & Milan.

External links 
 Soccer school
 MISL stats

1960 births
Living people
American Indoor Soccer Association players
American Soccer League (1988–89) players
American soccer coaches
American soccer players
American people of Croatian descent
Fort Wayne Flames players
Hartwick Hawks men's soccer players
Major Indoor Soccer League (1978–1992) players
Miami Freedom players
Pittsburgh Spirit players
San Jose Earthquakes (1974–1988) players
San Jose Oaks players
Western Soccer Alliance players
People from Folsom, California
Association football forwards